Georges Jules Piquet (January 13, 1839 – January 18, 1923) was Governor General for Inde française in the Second French Colonial Empire under Third Republic.

Titles Held

1839 births
1923 deaths
French colonial governors and administrators
Governors of French India
People of the French Third Republic